Kuan (Guan) is a Tai language of Laos. It is not easily classified within Tai, possibly due to migration.

References

Southwestern Tai languages
Languages of Laos